Blanca Marsillach del Río (born 23 March 1966) is a Spanish theatrical producer, actress, and businesswoman.

Biography 
Born in Barcelona on 23 March 1966, daughter to Adolfo Marsillach and Teresa del Río, Blanca Marsillach del Río was raised in Madrid's neighborhood of El Viso. Her older sister Cristina is also an actress. She earned a degree in drama from the University of Southern California. She also studied economics. After making early stage appearances under his father's guidance, she featured in Pedro Masó's television series Segunda enseñanza (1986), and Paul Verhoeven's adventure film Flesh and Blood (1985).

She created a theatre company in the United States, and also starred in plays such as Fool for Love, The Trojan Women and A Midsummer Night's Dream, later returning to Spain, where she developed a career as a theatrical producer, bringing forward stagings of Las entretenidas, La noche al desnudo, and Con las alas cortadas. She also starred as Myrtle in the play El reino de la tierra (which was also adapted by her alongside Elise Varela).

Filmography (actress)

References 

20th-century Spanish actresses
21st-century Spanish actresses
Spanish film actresses
Spanish stage actresses
1966 births
Living people
Women theatre managers and producers